Krishnasamy Veeramani (born 2 December 1933 in Cuddalore) is an Indian politician.

Personal 
Veeramani was born in  Cuddalore, South Arcot District, Tamil Nadu, his original name was Sarangapani. He had his primary education at Cuddalore and entered Annamalai University for higher education. He obtained his master's degree in economics in 1956 . He received his Bachelor of Law degree from Madras University in 1960.

Public life 
K. Veeramani came into limelight when as a boy of just 10, he was allowed to address the gathering in the Justice Party Salem conference in 1944. He was introduced as an activist by Annadurai. Apart from the one year in which he practiced as a lawyer in Cuddalore, his career has been as a social worker. He began working with Periyar in 1956, and assisted Periyar in editing Viduthalai, the rationalist daily of Dravidar Kazhagam. In 1962, he was made the executive editor of Viduthalai and since 1978 has been the editor. On 16 March 1978, Maniyammai died. The Managing Committee of the Dravidar Kazhagam elected K. Veeramani as General Secretary of the Dravidar Kazhagam on 17 March 1978. He was active in the social campaigns and agitations launched by Periyar for support of  ’socially discriminated people,’ and was incarcerated forty times for his activities. He was jailed under MISA for a year in 1976 for opposing The Emergency. He was again jailed in 1978 for showing black flags against Indira Gandhi for imposing Emergency while in power. While he was in jail, his father, C. S. Krishnasamy, died.

Awards 
Alagappa University conferred the Doctor of Law on him (Honoris Causa)  on 4 April 2003. Periyar International Inc., (USA) gives an annual award for outstanding contributions to Social Justice, which is named his honor. Mr. V. P. Singh, former Prime Minister of India, was the first recipient of the award. K.Veeramani is an Honorary Associate of Rationalist International.

Lifetime Achievement Award

In recognition and praise of Dravidar Kazhagam President Asiriyar K.Veeramani's humanist services, the American Humanist Association conferred the prestigious Lifetime Achievement Award for the year 2019 at the International Conference held on 21 and 22 September 2019.

American Humanist Association, a group of self-less, service-oriented humanitarians, has been promoting the cause of humanism for the past 75 years striving tirelessly for social justice and the welfare of the people.

List of K. Veeramani Awardees for Social Justice

References

External links 
 Periyar - Official homepage of Periyar
 Dravidar Kazhagam - Official homepage of Dravidar Kazhagam
 Rationalist International

Magazines 
 Viduthalai
 Unmai
 The Modern Rationalist
 Periyar Pinju

1933 births
Living people
Tamil Nadu politicians
Dravidian movement
Annamalai University alumni
Indian atheists
Indian rationalists
People from Cuddalore district
Periyarists